The Texas Legislature is the state legislature of the US state of Texas. It is a bicameral body composed of a 31-member Senate and a 150-member House of Representatives. The state legislature meets at the Capitol in Austin. It is a powerful arm of the Texas government not only because of its power of the purse to control and direct the activities of state government and the strong constitutional connections between it and the Lieutenant Governor of Texas, but also due to Texas's plural executive.

The Legislature is the constitutional successor of the Congress of the Republic of Texas since Texas's 1845 entrance into the Union. The Legislature held its first regular session from February 16 to May 13, 1846.

Structure and operations
The Texas Legislature meets in regular session on the second Tuesday in January of each odd-numbered year. The Texas Constitution limits the regular session to 140 calendar days. The lieutenant governor, elected statewide separately from the governor, presides over the Senate, while the Speaker of the House is elected from that body by its members. Both have wide latitude in choosing committee membership in their respective houses and have a large impact on lawmaking in the state.

Only the governor may call the Legislature into special sessions, unlike other states where the legislature may call itself into session. The governor may call as many sessions as desired. For example, Governor Rick Perry called three consecutive sessions to address the 2003 Texas congressional redistricting. The Texas Constitution limits the duration of each special session to 30 days; lawmakers may consider only those issues designated by the governor in his "call," or proclamation convening the special session (though other issues may be added by the Governor during a session).

Any bill passed by the Legislature takes effect 90 days after its passage unless two-thirds of each house votes to give the bill either immediate effect or earlier effect. The Legislature may provide for an effective date that is after the 90th day. Under current legislative practice, most bills are given an effective date of September 1 in odd-numbered years (September 1 is the start of the state's fiscal year).

Although members are elected on partisan ballots, both houses of the Legislature are officially organized on a nonpartisan basis, with members of both parties serving in leadership positions such as committee chairmanships. As of 2020, a majority of the members of each chamber are members of the Republican Party.

Qualifications for service
The Texas Constitution sets the qualifications for election to each house as follows:

A senator must be at least 26 years of age, a resident of Texas for five years prior to election and a resident of the district from which elected one year prior to election. Each senator serves a four-year term and one-half of the Senate membership is elected every two years in even-numbered years, with the exception that all the Senate seats are up for election for the first legislature following the decennial census in order to reflect the newly redrawn districts. After the initial election, the Senate is divided by lot into two classes, with one class having a re-election after two years and the other having a re-election after four years.
A representative must be at least 21 years of age, a citizen of Texas for two years prior to election and a resident of the district from which elected one year prior to election. They are elected for two-year terms, running for re-election in even-numbered years.
Neither may, for the time they were originally elected, hold any civil office under the State that was created during that term, nor for any such office whose compensation was increased during such time. Furthermore, judges (and their clerks) and any person holding a "lucrative office" under the United States, this State or a foreign government, cannot, while remaining in those offices, be a member of the Legislature; tax collectors and those entrusted with public money must receive a discharge for those funds before they are eligible to the Legislature.

Salary of legislative officials 
State legislators in Texas make $600 per month, or $7,200 per year, plus a per diem of $221 for every day the Legislature is in session (also including any special sessions). That adds up to $38,140 a year for a regular session (140 days), with the total pay for a two-year term being $45,340. Legislators receive a pension after eight years of service, starting at age 60.

Makeup

Senate

House of Representatives

2021 House quorum bust
Article III, Section 10 of the Texas Constitution requires that 2/3 of a chamber's members be present to constitute a quorum for conducting business (this is greater than what is required for the United States Congress, which only requires a simple majority of a chamber's members).  This has resulted in several instances where, in an effort to block legislation from passing, a sufficient number of members have fled the state in order to deny a quorum.

The most recent of these attempts took place during a 2021 special session of the Legislature.  On July 12, 2021, during a special session, at least 51 Democratic members of the House fled the state in two charter jets bound for Washington, D.C., in an effort to block Republican-backed election legislation from passing. The lawmakers planned to spend at least three weeks in Washington, running out the clock on the special session, which began July 8. During their time away from the state legislative chambers, they also advocated for federal voting legislation such as the For the People Act.

Governor Abbott stated that representatives, upon return to the state, would be arrested and escorted to the state legislative chambers to fulfill their lawmaking duties. He additionally noted he would use his power to call successive special sessions until such a time as the legislature met quorum to vote on the bill. After the first special session expired on August 6, Governor Abbott called a second session the next day. State District Judge Brad Urrutia granted a restraining order on August 9 temporarily protecting the absent Democrats from arrest by the state, however this restraining order was overturned by the Texas Supreme Court. On August 10, with the chamber still lacking a quorum, Speaker Dade Phelan issued arrest warrants for the 52 absent Democratic members of the House. The bill passed upon the eventual return of enough state Democrats to constitute a quorum in the legislature.

Support agencies
The Texas Legislature has five support agencies that are within the legislative branch of state government.

Those five agencies are as follows:
 Texas Legislative Budget Board
 Texas Legislative Council
 Texas Legislative Reference Library
 Texas State Auditor
 Texas Sunset Advisory Commission

Scandals 
 On May 14, 2007, CBS Austin affiliate KEYE reported on the rampant multiple voting by members of the Texas House of Representatives during a voting session. The report noted how representatives would race to the nearest empty seats to register votes for absent members on the legislature's automated voting machines. Each representative would vote for the nearest absent members, apparently regardless of party affiliation. This practice was in direct violation of a Rule of the Texas Legislature; however, no house member had ever been disciplined for the practice. The then-Speaker of the House Tom Craddick, responsible for enforcement of the rule, issued a statement that discipline for violations of the rule is left to the individual house members. Subsequent similar violations under House Speaker Joe Straus were unenforced.

See also

2019 Texas property tax reform
Sunset Advisory Commission

References

Further reading 
"Citizen Handbook". The Senate of Texas. Retrieved 13 September 2009.
. Retrieved 13 April 2005.
Stanley K. Young, Texas Legislative Handbook (1973).
Univ. of Tex., The Legislative Branch in Texas Politics,  (last accessed Oct. 8, 2006) (stating that "The Texas Legislature is the most powerful of the three main branches of government[,]" primarily because it is "less weak than the other branches").
See also: Texas Government Newsletter

External links 
Texas Legislature Online
Texas House of Representatives
Texas Senate
Open Government Texas from the Sunlight Foundation
Texas at Project Vote Smart
Texas Politics – The Legislative Branch
Texas Government Newsletter and Voter's Guide to the Texas Legislature
Billhop – Texas Legislative Wiki

 
Legislature, Texas
Bicameral legislatures